The Mask of the Sun is a graphical interactive fiction game developed by Ultrasoft and published in North America by Broderbund and in Europe by Ariolasoft. It was published in 1982 for the Apple II and versions for the Atari 8-bit family and Commodore 64 were released in 1984.

The hero is Mac Steele, an archaeologist who needs to find the Mask of the Sun in order to obtain an antidote to a poison that afflicts him from an artifact that he found. The game mostly takes place in Mexico in the Aztec ruins. Gameplay is text-based; however there are some graphics, including simple animations.

A sequel, The Serpent's Star, was developed by Ultrasoft and published in 1983 by Broderbund.

Reception 
Softline in 1983 noted the "innovative" animation and "excellent, detailed" graphics, and called the puzzles "very good". The magazine concluding that "The Mask of the Sun is a very good graphics adventure for the average to good adventurer". Ahoy! in 1984 liked Mask of the Suns graphics and vocabulary but noted long load times and low level of difficulty, stating that even novice adventurers would be able to finish the game "within a couple of weeks". Antic called Mask of the Suns graphics "absolutely superb" and the gameplay "excellent".

References

External links 
 The Mask of the Sun at Atari Mania
 The Mask of the Sun at the Museum of Computer Adventure Game History
 

1980s interactive fiction
1982 video games
Apple II games
Atari 8-bit family games
Broderbund games
Commodore 64 games
Video games based on Native American mythology
Video games developed in the United States
Video games set in Mexico
Ariolasoft games
Ultrasoft games